Paulo César Saraceni (5 November 1933 – 14 April 2012) was a Brazilian film director and screenwriter. He directed 14 films between 1960 and 2011. His 1999 film Traveller was entered into the 21st Moscow International Film Festival where it won a Special Mention.

Selected filmography
 Traveller (1999)

References

External links

1933 births
2012 deaths
Brazilian film directors
Brazilian screenwriters

Brazilian people of Italian descent